Rughidia is a genus of flowering plant in the family Apiaceae. 
It is endemic to Yemen and contains the following species:
 Rughidia cordatum
 Rughidia milleri

References

 
Apiaceae genera
Taxonomy articles created by Polbot
Nomina nuda